The Uzelginskaya mine is a large copper mine located in the south-west of Russia in Bashkortostan. Uzelginskaya represents one of the largest copper reserves in Russia and in the world having estimated reserves of 133 kilotonnes of ore grading 1.27% copper.

See also 
 List of mines in Russia

References 

Copper mines in Russia